Bahadorestan (also Romanized as Bahādorestān; also known as Bādāristān, Bahārestān, and Bahristān) is a village in Saruq Rural District, Saruq District, Farahan County, Markazi Province, Iran. At the 2006 census, its population was 477, in 116 families.

References 

Populated places in Farahan County